Maran Mayu (Quechua maran batan, mayu river, "batan river") is a Bolivian river in the Chuquisaca Department.

See also

List of rivers of Bolivia

References

Maran Mayu